Ptelina subhyalina is a butterfly in the family Lycaenidae. It is found at Ituri and Équateur in the Democratic Republic of the Congo.

References

Butterflies described in 1921
Poritiinae
Endemic fauna of the Democratic Republic of the Congo